Mount Adams is a  mountain located in Essex County of New York.  Atop the mountain is the Mount Adams Fire Observation Station, added to the National Register of Historic Places in 2006.

History
The first fire lookout structure built on the mountain was a wooden tower that was built by the Conservation Commission in 1912. In 1917, the Conservation Commission replaced it with a  steel Aermotor LS40 tower. The tower was ceased fire lookout operations at the end of the 1971 season.

Within this area is the fire tower, observer's cabin and other out buildings. It was planned that a large portion of this property would be transferred to the State of New York and subsequently become part of the High Peaks Wilderness Area, requiring that the tower and related structures be removed. After considerable pressure, the OSI and the DEC agreed that the surrounding lands would be transferred to the State with the exception of the tower and cabin sites. The tower and cabin would be retained by OSI so that historic preservation and restoration work could be done. Restoration work began on the tower by the DEC through AmeriCorp volunteers of the Student Conservation Association. In early April 2006, the Adirondack Park Agency gave final approval to the plan for the Tahawus Tract.

The observers cabin on Adams, which was built in 1922, is the oldest surviving in the state and one of the first of a standard design established by the Conservation Commission that same year. In September 2007, a friends group from ADKHighPeaks.com began a restoration project on the tower. Mount Adams fire tower now appears on the National Historic Lookout Register.

References

Mountains of Essex County, New York
Mountains of New York (state)